The 1985 Navy Midshipmen football team represented the United States Naval Academy as an independent during the 1985 NCAA Division I-A football season.

Schedule

Personnel

Season summary

North Carolina

at Delaware

at Indiana

at Virginia

Air Force

Lafayette

Pittsburgh

at Notre Dame

Syracuse

at South Carolina

vs Army

With Vice President and former Navy pilot George Bush in attendance, Napoleon McCallum rushed for 217 yards, the second-most rushing yards by a Navy player against Army, and broke the NCAA single-season all-purpose yardage record of Pitt's Tony Dorsett.

Awards
 Napoleon McCallum – Heisman Trophy voting (7th)

References

Navy
Navy Midshipmen football seasons
Navy Midshipmen football